The small bent-winged bat (Miniopterus pusillus) is a species of vesper bat in the family Miniopteridae. A novel version of coronavirus has been identified in this species. It can be found in Bangladesh, Bhutan, India, Indonesia, Laos, Malaysia, Nepal, Philippines, Thailand and Vietnam.

References

Mammals of India
Mammals of Nepal
Mammals of Bangladesh
Miniopteridae
Bats of Asia
Mammals described in 1876
Taxa named by George Edward Dobson
Taxonomy articles created by Polbot